BasKet Note Pads is a program based on Qt and KDE libraries for organizing, sharing, and taking notes. It can manage various types of information such as to-do lists, links, pictures, and other types, similar to a scrapbook.

See also 
List of KDE applications

References

External links 

Free note-taking software
Note-taking software
Software that uses Qt